2p15-16.1 microdeletion is an extremely rare genetic disorder caused by a small deletion in the short arm of human chromosome 2. First described in two patients in 2007, by 2013 only 21 people have been reported as having the disorder in the medical literature.

Presentation
As of 2013, only 21 patients with a 2p15-16.1 microdeletion had been identified. The clinical similarities between the individuals resulted in the classification of a new genetic syndrome. The shared clinical features include moderate to severe intellectual disability and similar facial features including telecanthus, drooping eyelids, downslanting, short palpebral fissures, a prominent nasal bridge, high palate with long, smooth philtrum and an everted lower lip. Some of the patients also had feeding problems in infancy, microcephaly, optic nerve hypoplasia and hydronephrosis, wide-spaced nipples, short stature, cortical dysplasia, camptodactyly and pigeon toe.

Cause

Three of the patients reported had a consistent proximal breakpoint on chromosome 2, but varying distal breakpoints.  The patients have 2p15–16.1 deletions of 5.7 megabases (Mb), 4.5 Mb, 3.9 Mb, 3.35Mb 3.3Mb and 570 kilobases, respectively. In all 21 patients the deletions are de novo — neither parent possessed nor transmitted the mutation to the affected individual. One patient is a genetic mosaic, having some cells with the deletion and others without.

Affected genes
The largest deletion encompasses approximately 15 protein-coding genes, 6 pseudogenes and a number of other as yet uncharacterised candidates, including:
 AHSA2, activator of heat shock 90kDa protein ATPase homolog
 BCL11A, B-cell lymphoma/leukemia 11A
 C2orf74, Uncharacterized protein C2orf74 
 FANCL, E3 ubiquitin-protein ligase FANCL
 KIAA1841, Uncharacterized protein KIAA1841
 PAPOLG, Poly(A) polymerase gamma
 PEX13, Peroxisomal membrane protein Peroxin-13
 PUS10, Pseudouridylate synthase 10
 REL, C-Rel proto-oncogene protein
 SNORA70B, small nucleolar RNA, H/ACA box 70B 
 USP34, Ubiquitin carboxyl-terminal hydrolase 34
 VRK2, Serine/threonine-protein kinase VRK2
 XPO1, Exportin-1

Diagnosis

Treatment

References

External links 

 
 Orphanet entry for 2p15-16.1 microdeletion syndrome
 

Autosomal monosomies and deletions
Genetic anomalies
Syndromes with intellectual disability
Syndromes with craniofacial abnormalities
Syndromes with microcephaly
Syndromes with short stature
Syndromes affecting the kidneys
Syndromes with dysmelia
Chromosomal abnormalities